is a Japanese badminton player who is the reigning two-time World Champion, winning gold in the women's singles at the 2021 and 2022 World Championships. She was on the winning Japanese team at the Asian Junior Championships in 2012 and won various women's singles titles afterward. She then won the World Junior Championships in 2013 and 2014, the Asian Junior Championships in 2014, and the Asian Championships in 2019. She helped Japan in winning by the maximum score of 3–0 at the 2017, 2018, and 2020 Asia Team Championships, and to end 37 years for Japan without a title in the Uber Cup in 2018.

Career

2010–2012 
Yamaguchi topped Japan's National Junior Championship in 2010, and her first entry into professional competition took place at Osaka International Challenge in 2012. In July 2012, she represented Japan at the Asian Junior Championships in Gimcheon, South Korea. She reached the semi-finals in the women's singles event and was awarded the bronze medal, losing to Nozomi Okuhara with a score of 19–21 and 9–21. She was also inducted into Japan's national junior team that won Japan's first junior mixed team title. Yamaguchi reached the finals of the World Junior Championships in the singles event, coming  second when she lost to Okuhara again.

2013 
In April 2013, Yamaguchi finished second to Kaori Imabeppu at the Osaka International in the women's singles event with a score of 20–22, 16–21. She was the women's singles runner-up in the New Zealand Open, a Grand Prix tournament. She participated in the Japanese Open, unseeded. She defeated P. V. Sindhu, the bronze medalist from the recently concluded World Championships in two straight games in round sixteen. She also defeated seeded player Tai Tzu-ying in a semifinal, leading to her match-up with her compatriot Shizuka Uchida, whom she beat in the final to  become the youngest player to win the BWF Super Series tournament, aged only 16. This was also Japan's first ever victory at the home event since 1981.

One year after losing the final at the World Juniors competition, Yamaguchi won the title by beating her teammate Aya Ohori.
While in high school, Yamaguchi won the national badminton competition, competing in the women's singles event. At the 2nd Asian Youth Games held in Nanjing, China in August 2013, where she represented  Fukushima Prefectural Tomioka High School, she won the gold medal in mixed doubles. In October, she represented Japan at the East Asian Games held in Tianjin, China, where she finished third in the women's singles event, losing in three sets to Wang Shixian. After graduating from high school, she joined the Re-Shunkan Pharmaceutical badminton team.

Yamaguchi was named the Most Promising Player of the Year by the Badminton World Federation in late 2013 and 2014.

2014 
At the Malaysian Open in January, Yamaguchi defeated reigning World Champion Ratchanok Intanon in the first round in three games. In February, still a teenager, Yamaguchi entered the 2014 Asian Junior Championships as a fourth seed. She won the title by defeating Chen Yufei from China. She competed at the All England Open in March. She defended her World Junior crown, winning against Chinese player He Bingjiao in the final round.

She was part of the Japanese team that won the silver medal at the 2014 Uber Cup. Yamaguchi lost no match in any tie. On 16 August, Yamaguchi served as the flag-bearer for the Japanese team at the opening ceremony of the 2014 Summer Youth Olympics in Nanjing, China. She was the number one seed in the women's singles event, eventually winning the silver medal.

At the China Open in November, Yamaguchi defeated top ranked players in two straight games, Wang Shixian, Sun Yu, Bae Yeon-ju and reached the final. She finished as runner-up in the tournament after losing to Saina Nehwal. She then won the All Japan General Championships in December. At 17 years of age, she was the second-youngest player to win the tournament.

She qualified for participation in the end of year championships, the Super Series Finals tournament held in December. She won all of her group matches against former champion Wang Yihan then against Ratchanok Intanon and Tai Tzu-ying as well. She lost against Korean player Sung Ji-hyun and finished as the semi-finalist.

2015–2016 
In the second round of the Indonesian Open in June 2015, Yamaguchi registered victory over the reigning Olympic champion Li Xuerui. At the Japan Open, where she was the champion two years ago, this time she was beaten in the final by Nozomi Okuhara. In October, she became champion of the Bitburger Open with a victory over Thailand's Busanan Ongbamrungphan.

In August 2016, Yamaguchi represented her country at the 2016 Summer Olympics held in Rio de Janeiro, Brazil. She was eliminated in the quarter finals by sixth seed Nozomi Okuhara. In October, Yamaguchi won her second Super Series title at the Korea Open, beating Sung Ji-hyun. She followed this with a win at the Denmark Open held at Odense. On her way to victory, Yamaguchi defeated her teammate Okuhara in the quarter-finals and two-time World Champion and Olympic gold medalist Carolina Marín in a close three-set match in the semi-finals. In the women's singles final, she defeated the No. 2 seed, Tai Tzu-ying, winning the tournament.

2017 
In February 2017, Yamaguchi represented Japan at the Asia Mixed Team Championships held in Ho Chi Minh City, Vietnam, and helped the team win its first mixed team championship. In the same month, she won the title at the German Open. Her opponent Carolina Marín gave walkover in the final showdown. In April, she participated in the Asian Championships held in Wuhan, China, losing to Tai Tzu-ying in the final.

In August, Yamaguchi played in the World Championships in Glasgow. She was the No. 1 seed and had a bye in the first round. She defeated Denmark's Line Kjærsfeldt in the second round, but faced No. 9 seed Chen Yufei in the third round and was defeated 18–21, 19–21. She was the finalist at the Australian Super Series where she lost to Nozomi Okuhara. Afterwards she finished as a finalist in Denmark where she lost to Ratchanok Intanon. She was 19–16 up in the decider but her opponent reeled off five straight points and won.

In October, she played in the French Open and lost the final to the top seed, Tai Tzu-ying in a one-sided match. Her consistent run continued and she reached final in the China Open. She defeated her rival from China Gao Fangjie with 21–13, 21–15 to win her first title of the year.

In December, she played in the Dubai World Super Series Finals, defeating Sayaka Sato and He Bingjiao and losing to India's P. V. Sindhu in the group stage. She won the semi-final, defeating Ratchanok Intanon. In the final, Yamaguchi defeated Sindhu, the World Championship runner-up, winning the women's singles championship in the Super Series Finals. Yamaguchi ended up the year collecting US$261,363 from 15 tournaments, becoming the highest-paid player of the year.

2018 
In March 2018, Yamaguchi played in the Super 300 German Open tournament. She won the title after defeating the No. 4 seed, China's Chen Yufei, in the final. She reached her first ever final at the All England Open where she was in the losing side to Tai Tzu-ying. In May, she was selected as the main force of the Uber Cup women's singles, helping the Japanese team regain the women's team championship after 48 years, or 37 years if both genders are considered.

In July, she participated in the World Championships held in Nanjing, China. She was the second seed. In the top four, facing the Olympic runner-up P. V. Sindhu, she lost both games, finishing in third place in the World Championships women's singles.

In August, she represented Japan in the Asian Games held in Jakarta, Indonesia, and helped the Japanese women's team win the gold medal. In the women's singles semi-finals, facing the tournament's No. 3 seed Olympic runner-up P. V. Sindhu, Yamaguchi lost 1–2, winning the women's singles bronze medal. In a repeat clash of previous edition's French Open final, Yamaguchi beat the top seeded Tai Tzu-ying in three games, 22–20, 17–21, 21–13. In the process, she avenged her defeat to Tai at the same stage an year ago.

2019 
In February 2019, Yamaguchi played in the German Open. In the final, she defeated the No. 3 seed Ratchanok Intanon 2–1 to become the Super 300 women's singles champion. In April, she played in the Malaysia Open, finishing as the runner-up after losing to her arch rival Tai Tzu-ying, 0–2. She won the Asian Championships. In the semi-final, she defeated Chen Yufei, the top seed and made it through to the final where she defeated He Bingjiao, winning her first such title and becoming the first Japanese Women's singles player to do so.

In July, she won the Japan Open, her second Japan Open title since her first six years prior. That same month, she won a match against Taiwanese competitor Tai Tzu-ying, the highest-ranked player in the world, placing her in the finals of her first Indonesia Open. She outlasted P. V. Sindhu in the final round and bagged her first Super 1000 title. In August, Yamaguchi suffered injury and was defeated in the second round of the 2019 BWF World Championships held in Basel, Switzerland, by 20-year-old Yeo Jia Min of Singapore 0–2. She qualified for competing in the World Tour Finals in Guangzhou and finished as a semifinalist after being defeated by Chen Yufei.

2020–2021 
In 2020, Yamaguchi claimed her first title victory of the year at the Thailand Masters, winning against An Se-young in two consecutive games. She was then in the Japanese team that won the Asian Women's team championship.

Yamaguchi competed at the 2020 Summer Olympics as the number four seed. Just like the last edition, she was defeated in the quarterfinals. She lost against P. V. Sindhu. Yamaguchi became the Denmark Open champion for the second time by besting her rival from South Korea, An Se-young. This was also her second super 1000 title. She won her second consecutive title by winning the French Open Super 750 event against Sayaka Takahashi. Her rivalry against An Se-young continued and both met at the Indonesian Masters final. This time Yamaguchi lost to An in two games. Yamaguchi was crowned the World Champion after she defeated Tai Tzu-ying in the final and with this she became only the second Japanese women's singles player to win the World Championships after Nozomi Okuhara.

Playing style 
Chinese player Sun Yu has commented on Yamaguchi's style, pointing out that while small, she is diligent and runs swiftly, and she is capable of picking up the kinds of difficult shots that others are typically unable to save. Sun Yu suggested that her style of play is based upon patience and consistent performance,  observing that she does not make mistakes often, and simultaneously takes advantage to score from opponents who rush and make errors. Another Chinese player, Wang Shixian, agrees that Yamaguchi is quick and nimble, and for challengers to be successful, they need to be capable of matching her speed.

In 2019, Li Yongbo, head coach of the Chinese team, commented on the Japanese player:

Achievements

BWF World Championships 
Women's singles

Asian Games 
Women's singles

Asian Championships 
Women's singles

East Asian Games 
Women's singles

Youth Olympic Games 
Girls' singles

World Junior Championships 
Girls' singles

Asian Youth Games 
Mixed doubles

Asian Junior Championships 
Girls' singles

BWF World Tour (13 titles, 4 runners-up) 
The BWF World Tour, which was announced on 19 March 2017 and implemented in 2018, is a series of elite badminton tournaments sanctioned by the Badminton World Federation (BWF). The BWF World Tour is divided into levels of World Tour Finals, Super 1000, Super 750, Super 500, Super 300, and the BWF Tour Super 100.

Women's singles

BWF Superseries (5 titles, 5 runners-up) 
The BWF Superseries, which was launched on 14 December 2006 and implemented in 2007, was a series of elite badminton tournaments, sanctioned by the BWF. BWF Superseries levels were Superseries and Superseries Premier. A season of Superseries consisted of twelve tournaments around the world that had been introduced since 2011. Successful players were invited to the Superseries Finals, which were held at the end of each year.

Women's singles

  BWF Super Series Finals tournament
  BWF Super Series Premier tournament
  BWF Super Series tournament

BWF Grand Prix (2 titles, 1 runner-up) 
The BWF Grand Prix had two levels, the Grand Prix and Grand Prix Gold. It was a series of badminton tournaments sanctioned by the BWF and played between 2007 and 2017.

Women's singles

 BWF Grand Prix Gold tournament
 BWF Grand Prix tournament

BWF International Challenge/Series (1 runner-up) 
Women's singles

 BWF International Challenge tournament
 BWF International Series tournament

Performance timeline

Overview

National team

Junior level

Senior level

Individual competitions

Junior level 
Girls' singles

Mixed doubles

Senior level

Women's singles

Women's doubles

Record against other players 
Yamaguchi's record against year-end Finals finalists, World Championships semi-finalists, and Olympic quarter-finalists. Accurate as of 7 February 2023.

References

External links 

 
 
 
 
 

1997 births
Asian Games bronze medalists for Japan
Asian Games gold medalists for Japan
Asian Games medalists in badminton
Badminton players at the 2014 Asian Games
Badminton players at the 2014 Summer Youth Olympics
Badminton players at the 2016 Summer Olympics
Badminton players at the 2018 Asian Games
Badminton players at the 2020 Summer Olympics
Japanese female badminton players
Living people
Medalists at the 2014 Asian Games
Medalists at the 2018 Asian Games
Olympic badminton players of Japan
Sportspeople from Fukui Prefecture
World No. 1 badminton players
21st-century Japanese women